Ray Lane may refer to:

 Ray Lane (sportscaster) (born 1931), American sportscaster
 Raymond J. Lane (born 1946), American business executive

See also
 Raymond Lane (disambiguation)